David Levine (born July 3, 1993) is an American professional stock car racing driver. He has driven in the NASCAR Camping World Truck Series, NASCAR K&N Pro Series East and ARCA Racing Series.

Early career and education
Levine became interested in racing as a 10-year-old when he and his father went to an indoor carting track. Levine attended grade school through the 8th grade at Lake Forest Country Day School, a coeducational, independent preK-8 school located in Lake Forest, Illinois. He is a 2011 graduate of Lake Forest Academy, a prestigious college preparatory boarding school located on the North Shore in Lake Forest, Illinois. After Lake Forest Academy, Levine earned his Bachelor of Arts degree in Communications Studies from Furman University in Greenville, SC in May 2015. Levine  initially learned his road racing driving skills at the Skip Barber Racing School.

NASCAR

Camping World Truck Series

2015
It was announced in October 2015 that Levine would attempt to make his NASCAR Camping World Truck Series racing debut in the season-ending Ford EcoBoost 200 at Homestead-Miami Speedway on November 20, driving for Lira Motorsports. Levine finished the race in the 17th position.

2016
On February 15, it was announced that Levine joined MAKE Motorsports to race at the season opener at Daytona. He was one of 11 drivers who failed to qualify for the field.

K&N Pro Series East

Levine drove in the NASCAR K&N Pro Series East races at New Jersey Motorsports Park in 2017 and 2018.

ARCA Racing Series

2012
Levine's ARCA Racing Series debut was at Chicagoland Speedway on July 21, 2012. In a car sponsored by the Richard Petty Driving Experience, Levine started 13th and finished 12th.

2013
Levine competed in three ARCA Racing Series races in 2013. At Road America on June 22 he started 10th and finished 9th. At Chicagoland Speedway on July 21 he started 22nd and finished 14th. At New Jersey Motorsports Park on July 28 he started 13th and finished 10th.

2015
It was announced in December 2014 that Levine would race full-time in the ARCA Racing Series for Lira Motorsports. He raced the team's number 59 car in 2015. Through the first 17 races of 2015, David had started in the top ten four times, and finished in the top ten nine times. His best finish was 6th place at both Fairgrounds Speedway Nashville on April 11 and Pocono Raceway on August 1. His primary sponsors with Lira Motorsports are Momo, TraqGear, Ford Performance and Roush Performance. In the final three races of 2015, Levine finished 15th at Salem Speedway, 3rd at Kentucky Speedway and 8th at Kansas Speedway. His third place at Kentucky Speedway is his career best ARCA Series finish to date. Levine finished 2015 with a total of 11 top ten finishes.

2016
Levine competed in 1 ARCA Racing Series Event in 2016, the Twilight 150 presented by Unique Pretzels at the New Jersey Motorsports Park. Driving for the Mason Mitchell Motorsports team in the No. 98 car sponsored by Revant Optics, he qualified in the 3rd starting position and finished the race in 5th place.

IMSA Continental Tire Sports Car Challenge

2012
Racing the No. 81 for Bimmer World Racing in a BMW 328i, Levine finished 6th in the IMSA Continental Tire SportsCar Challenge ST Division national driver points standings. He had five top 10 finishes in nine races, including one win at Barber Motorsports Park.

2013
Racing the No. 78 Racers Edge Motorsports Mustang Boss 302R in the Grand Sport Division, David had two top ten finishes in 10 races. His best finish was 8th at Kansas Speedway. He finished 21st in IMSA Continental Tire SportsCar Challenge GS Division national driver points standings.

2014
Racing the No. 78 Racers Edge Ford Mustang, Levinefinished 12th in the national IMSA Continental Tire SportsCar Challenge driver points standings in the Grand Sport Division. He had a total of six top 10 finishes in 12 races, with a best finish of 5th at both Sebring and Road Atlanta.

2015
Levine competed in one International Motor Sports Association (IMSA) Continental Tire SportsCar Challenge Series race in 2015, the October 2 two-and-a-half hour event at Road Atlanta. Along with co-driver Michael Lira, Levine finished the race in 10th place.

Skip Barber Racing School
Prior to racing in the IMSA Continental Tire Series, Levine learned road racing driving skills at the Skip Barber Racing School. While there, he drove many types of cars, including  stock cars and Midgets. While at Skip Barber, he also raced in the MAZDASPEED Challenge Series, logging four wins.

American Heart Association
Levine was born with a heart defect that required open-heart surgery at four months old. As a racing driver, he routinely visits children’s hospitals to cheer up young patients on behalf of the American Heart Association. He also has his own, personal American Heart Association campaign, called DriveForHeart, which serves to raise awareness about congenital heart defects and let racing fans know how important living a healthy lifestyle is at any age.

Motorsports career results

NASCAR
(key) (Bold – Pole position awarded by qualifying time. Italics – Pole position earned by points standings or practice time. * – Most laps led.)

Camping World Truck Series

K&N Pro Series East

ARCA Racing Series
(key) (Bold – Pole position awarded by qualifying time. Italics – Pole position earned by points standings or practice time. * – Most laps led.)

References

External links
 
 
 DriveForHeart.org

Living people
1993 births
Racing drivers from Illinois
ARCA Menards Series drivers
Lake Forest Academy alumni